Joshua Adam Langfeld (born July 17, 1977) is an American former professional ice hockey player. Today he coaches the 2008 AAA Little Caesars Hockey Team.

Playing career
Langfeld was drafted in the 3rd round, 66th overall, in the 1997 NHL Entry Draft by the Ottawa Senators. He played four years at the University of Michigan before turning pro. In 1998, Langfeld scored the game-winning goal against Boston College in overtime to win the 1998 NCAA Division I Men's Ice Hockey Tournament for the University of Michigan.

He was traded multiple times as he toured the league with the Senators, San Jose Sharks, and the Detroit Red Wings, as well as American Hockey League clubs the Grand Rapids Griffins, Milwaukee Admirals, and Binghamton Senators.

Career statistics

Awards and honors

References

External links

1977 births
American men's ice hockey right wingers
Binghamton Senators players
Boston Bruins players
Detroit Red Wings players
Frankfurt Lions players
Grand Rapids Griffins players
Lincoln Stars players
Living people
Michigan Wolverines men's ice hockey players
Milwaukee Admirals players
Nashville Predators players
Ottawa Senators draft picks
Ottawa Senators players
People from Coon Rapids, Minnesota
San Jose Sharks players
Ice hockey players from Minnesota
NCAA men's ice hockey national champions